Events in the year 1964 in Mexico.

Incumbents

Federal government
 President: Adolfo López Mateos (until November 30), Gustavo Díaz Ordaz (starting December 1)
 Interior Secretary (SEGOB): Luis Echeverría Álvarez
 Secretary of Foreign Affairs (SRE): Manuel Tello Baurraud/José Gorostiza/Antonio Carrillo Flores
 Communications Secretary (SCT): Walter Cross Buchanan/José Antonio Padilla Segura
 Education Secretary (SEP): Jaime Torres Bodet/Agustín Yáñez
 Secretary of Defense (SEDENA): Agustín Olachea/Marcelino García Barragan
 Secretary of Navy: Manuel Zermeño Araico/Antonio Vázquez del Mercado
 Secretary of Labor and Social Welfare: Salomón González Blanco
 Secretary of Welfare: Javier Barros Sierra/Gilberto Valenzuela

Supreme Court

 President of the Supreme Court: Alfonso Guzmán Neyra

Governors

 Aguascalientes: Enrique Olivares Santana
 Baja California
Eligio Esquivel Méndez (died in office, December 17.
Gustavo Aubanel Vallejo (Substitute)
 Campeche: José Ortiz Avila
 Chiapas: Práxedes Ginér Durán
 Chihuahua: Braulio Fernández Aguirre
 Coahuila: Braulio Fernández Aguirre
 Colima: Francisco Velasco Curiel
 Durango: Enrique Dupré Ceniceros 
 Guanajuato: Juan José Torres Landa
 Guerrero: Raymundo Abarca Alarcón
 Hidalgo: Carlos Ramírez Guerrero
 Jalisco: Juan Gil Preciado/José de Jesús Muñoz Limón
 State of Mexico: Juan Fernández Albarrán
 Michoacán: Agustín Arriaga
 Morelos: Emilio Riva Palacio
 Nayarit: Julián Gazcón Mercado
 Nuevo León: Eduardo Livas Villarreal
 Oaxaca: Rodolfo Brena Torres
 Puebla: Arturo Fernández Aguirre
 Querétaro: Manuel González Cosío
 San Luis Potosí: Manuel López Dávila
 Sinaloa: Leopoldo Sánchez Celis
 Sonora: Luis Encinas Johnson
 Tabasco: Carlos A. Madrazo Becerra
 Tamaulipas: Praxedis Balboa	
 Tlaxcala: Anselmo Cervantes
 Veracruz: Fernando López Arias
 Yucatán: Agustín Franco Aguilar/Luis Torres Mesías
 Zacatecas: José Rodríguez Elías
Regent of the Federal District: Ernesto P. Uruchurtu

Events

 La Preparatoria Benemérito de las Américas is founded by Albert Kenyon Wagner and his wife, Leona Farnsworth Romney 
 Amusement park La Feria Chapultepec Mágico opens its doors. 
 Museo Nacional de Antropología, Museo de Arte Moderno and the Alfredo Guati Rojo National Watercolor Museum are established. 
1964 Mexican general election

Awards
Belisario Domínguez Medal of Honor – Adrián Aguirre Benavides

Births
February 4 — Luis Alegre Salazar, businessman and politician (d. 2022)
June 13 — Edith González, actress and dancer (d. 2019)
August 5
Miguel Ángel Osorio Chong, Governor of Hidalgo 2005–2011 and Secretary of the Interior 2012–2018.
Claudio Reyes Rubio, TV director (Televisa); auto accident; (d. 2017).
August 11 — Héctor Soberón, actor
October 9 — Guillermo del Toro, filmmaker (three Academy Awards), author, and actor.
November 14 — Raúl Araiza, actor and TV presenter 
November 30 - Emmanuel Lubezki, Cinematographer (three Academy Awards)
November 23 — Erika Buenfil, television actress (Tres Mujeres, Amores Verdaderos)
Date unknown
Martín Barrón Félix, physicist and meteorologist (d. 2017)

Deaths
August 12 — Isidro Fabela, judge, writer, publisher, Governor of the State of Mexico (PRI, 1942–1945), diplomat (b. 1882)

Film

 List of Mexican films of 1964

Sport

 1963–64 Mexican Primera División season 
 Football Club Petroleros de Ciudad Madero is founded
 1964 Mexican Grand Prix 
 Mexico at the 1964 Summer Olympics

References

 
Years in Mexico
Mexico